This is a list of diplomatic missions of Kazakhstan, excluding honorary consulates. Kazakhstan is a landlocked Central Asian country.

Africa

 Cairo (Embassy)

 Addis Ababa (Embassy)

 Rabat (Embassy)

 Pretoria (Embassy)

Americas

 Brasilia (Embassy)

 Ottawa (Embassy)
 Toronto (Consulate)

 Havana (Embassy)

 Mexico City (Embassy)

Washington, D.C. (Embassy)
 New York City (Consulate-General)
San Francisco (Consulate-General)

Asia

 Kabul (Embassy)

 Yerevan (Embassy)

 Baku (Embassy)

 Beijing (Embassy)
 Hong Kong (Consulate-General)
 Shanghai (Consulate-General)
 Ürümqi (Visa Office)

 Tbilisi (Embassy)

 New Delhi (Embassy)

 Jakarta (Embassy)

 Tehran (Embassy)
 Gorgan (Consulate-General)
 Bandar Abbas (Consulate)

 Tel Aviv (Embassy)

 Tokyo (Embassy)

 Amman (Embassy)

 Kuwait City (Embassy)

 Bishkek (Embassy)
 Osh (Consulate)

 Beirut (Embassy)

 Kuala Lumpur (Embassy)

 Ulan Bator (Embassy)

 Muscat (Embassy)

 Islamabad (Embassy)

 Doha (Embassy)

 Riyadh (Embassy)

 Singapore (Embassy)

 Seoul (Embassy)
 Busan (Consulate-general)

 Damascus (Consulate-General)

 Dushanbe (Embassy)
 Khujand (Consulate)

 Bangkok (Embassy)

 Ankara (Embassy)
 Antalya (Consulate)
 Istanbul (Consulate-General)

 Ashgabat (Embassy)
 Turkmenbashi (Consulate-General)

 Abu Dhabi (Embassy)
 Dubai (Consulate-General)

 Tashkent (Embassy)

 Hanoi (Embassy)

Europe

 Vienna (Embassy)

 Minsk (Embassy)
 Brest (Consulate)

 Brussels (Embassy)

 Sofia (Embassy)

 Zagreb (Embassy)

 Prague (Embassy)

 Tallinn (Embassy)

 Helsinki (Embassy)

 Paris (Embassy)
 Strasbourg (Consulate-General)

 Berlin (Embassy)
 Bonn (Embassy branch office)
 Frankfurt (Consulate-General)
 Munich (Consulate)

 Athens (Embassy)

 Budapest (Embassy)

 Rome (Embassy)

 Riga (Embassy)

 Vilnius (Embassy)

 Chișinău (Embassy)

 The Hague (Embassy)

 Oslo (Embassy)

 Warsaw (Embassy)

 Lisbon (Embassy)

 Bucharest (Embassy)

 Moscow (Embassy)
 Kazan (Consulate-General)
 Saint Petersburg (Consulate-General)
 Astrakhan (Consulate)
 Omsk (Consulate)

 Belgrade (Embassy)

 Bratislava (Embassy)

 Madrid (Embassy)
 Barcelona (Consulate)

 Stockholm (Embassy)

 Bern (Embassy)

 Kyiv (Embassy)

 London (Embassy)

Oceania

 Sydney (Consulate-General)

Multilateral organisations
 Geneva (Permanent Mission to the United Nations and other international organisations)
 New York (Permanent Mission to the United Nations)
 Paris (Permanent Mission to UNESCO)

Gallery

See also
 Foreign relations of Kazakhstan
 List of diplomatic missions in Kazakhstan

References

 Ministry of Foreign Affairs of Kazakhstan

 
Diplomatic missions
Kazakhstan